Bəylik may refer to:
 Bəylik, Agdash, Azerbaijan
 Bəylik, Saatly, Azerbaijan
 Bəylik, Lachin, Azerbaijan